The Simple Bus Architecture (SBA) is a form of computer architecture. It is made up software tools and intellectual property cores (IP Core) interconnected by buses using simple and clear rules, that allow the implementation of an embedded system (SoC). Basic templates are provided to accelerate design. The VHDL code that implements this architecture is portable.

Master core 

The master core is a finite state machine (FSM) and performs basic data flow and processing, similar to a microprocessor, but with lower consumption of logic resources.

Wishbone 

SBA is an application and a simplified version of the Wishbone specification. SBA implements the minimum essential subset of the Wishbone signals interface. It can be connected with simple Wishbone IP Cores. SBA defines three types of cores: masters, slaves, and auxiliaries. Several slave IP Cores were developed following the SBA architecture, many to implement virtual instruments.

References 

Computer buses